Zabriskie House may refer to:

Nebraska
 Edgar Zabriskie Residence, Omaha, Nebraska

New Jersey
 Zabriskie-Steuben House, River Edge, New Jersey
 Albert J. Zabriskie Farmhouse, Paramus, New Jersey
 Garret Zabriskie House, Haworth, New Jersey
 Nicholas Zabriskie House, Washington Township, New Jersey
 Rathbone-Zabriskie House, Ridgewood, New Jersey
 Van Voorhees-Quackenbush House, Wyckoff, New Jersey
 Zabriskie House (Ho-Ho-Kus, New Jersey), Ho-Ho-Kus, New Jersey
 Zabriskie-Christie House, Dumont, New Jersey
 Zabriskie-Kipp-Cadmus House, Teaneck, New Jersey
 Zabriskie Tenant House, Paramus, New Jersey

See also
 Zabriskie, a surname